Cheyenne Mountain High School (CMHS) is located in Colorado Springs, Colorado, United States. It is the only high school in Cheyenne Mountain School District 12. Its campus contains several buildings, including a recreation center, library, cafeteria, and an arts building.

History
In 2004, Cheyenne Mountain School District was designated one of the top 100 school districts in the nation. It is a nationally recognized Blue Ribbon School. The district is ranked nationally for its renowned fine arts and athletic programs.

In 2016, construction crews finished the process of improving the school by renovating the academic building, athletic fields, and other parts of the school.

Mascot 
On March 7, 2021 the Cheyenne Mountain school board voted to retire the current high school mascot, an American Indian wearing the traditional headdress.

On July 7, 2021 the Cheyenne Mountain school board changed the mascot to the Red-Tailed Hawk.

Music
 A cappella groups:
 Crimson was the International Championship of High School A Capella champions in 2005; runner-up in 2006 and 2007.
 Slate was the International Championship of High School A Capella runner-up in 2006.

Athletics
Cheyenne Mountain has many different athletic teams, and has won over 100 state championships. Sports teams include boys' hockey, boys' and girls' tennis, boys' and girls’ cross country, boys' and girls' soccer, boys' and girls' swimming, boys’ and girls’ golf, boys' and girls’ lacrosse, girls’ field hockey, boys’ football, boys’ baseball, boys' and girls’ track & field, boys’ and girls’ basketball and girls' volleyball.

State championship titles:
Baseball: 1958 (A), 1959 (A), 1960 (A), 1962 (A), 2009 (4A), 2011 (4A)
Boys' cross country: 2001 (4A), 2010 (4A), 2021 (4A), 2022 (4A)
Girls' cross country: 2010 (4A)
Football: 1963 (4A)
Boys' Golf: Chase Mercer, 1996; Tom Glissmeyer, 2003 and 2004; 2004 (team, 4A), 2020 (team, 4A), 2022 (team, 4A)
Girls' Golf: 2013 (team), 2014 (team), 2015 (team)
Cheerleading: 2011 (team 4A)
Ice hockey: 1982, 1983, 1984, 1985, 1986, 1988, 1989, 1990, 1991, 1996, 1997, 1999, 2002, 2004, 2022, 2023
Boys' lacrosse: 2018 (4A), 2021 (4A), 2022 (4A)
Boys' soccer: 1992 (1A-4A), 1995 (3A), 2013 (4A)
Girls' soccer: 1997 (3A), 2005 (4A), 2007 (4A), 2013, 2014, 2015, 2019
Boys' swimming: 2000 (4A), 2001 (4A), 2002 (4A), 2015 (4A), 2016 (4A), 2017 (4A)
Girls' swimming: 2002 (4A), 2017, 2020
Boys' tennis: 1992, 1993, 1994, 1995, 1996, 1997, 1998, 1999, 2000, 2001, 2002, 2005, 2006, 2007, 2010, 2011, 2012, 2019, 2021
Girls' tennis: 1986, 1987, 1988, 1991, 1992, 1993, 1994, 1995, 1996, 1997, 1998, 2000, 2007, 2009, 2010, 2011, 2012, 2013, 2014, 2015, 2016, 2017, 2019, 2022
Boys' track and field: 1993 (4A), 1994  (4A), 2011 (4A)
Girls’ volleyball: 2008 (4A), 2009 (4A), 2010 (4A), 2011 (4A), 2012 (4A), 2015 (4A)
Boys' Wrestling: 2021 (4A)

Notable alumni

Canyon Barry (2012), basketball player
 Matt Darwin, former NFL player
 Steve Johnson, member of Duke University's 2010 NCAA National Basketball Championship team
 Floyd K. Lindstrom (1931), soldier, recipient of the Medal of Honor in World War II
 John Arthur Love (1934), former Colorado governor (1963–73)
 Brandon McCarthy (2001), Major League Baseball pitcher
 Dave Mlicki, former MLB pitcher
 Johann Sebastian Paetsch (1982), cellist
Due to its location, Cheyenne Mountain High School has had many students who trained at the Broadmoor Skating Club. Skaters include:
Max Aaron (2010)
Jeremy Abbott (2004)
Rachael Flatt (2010)
Peggy Fleming
Alexe Gilles  (2010)
Piper Gilles  (2010)
Todd Gilles (2004)
David Jenkins
Hayes Alan Jenkins
Caryn Kadavy (1987)
Ann Patrice McDonough (2003)
Timothy McKernan
Keauna McLaughlin
Brandon Mroz (2011)
Max Schultz
Alex Shibutani
Jill Trenary (1987)
Stephanie Westerfeld
Agnes Zawadzki

References

External links

Cheyenne Mountain School District 12 website

School buildings completed in 1962
Educational institutions established in 1872
High schools in Colorado Springs, Colorado
Public high schools in Colorado
1872 establishments in Colorado Territory